Events in the year 2021 in Morocco. Rebels have declared the independence of the Sahrawi Arab Democratic Republic in the general area of Western Sahara.

Incumbents
 King: Mohammed VI
 President of the Government: Saadeddine Othmani (until 7 October), Aziz Akhannouch (since 7 October)

Events

January and February
9 January – David Schenker, assistant secretary of state for near eastern affairs, and the highest-ranking U.S. diplomat for North Africa and the Middle East, visits Western Sahara.
15 January – U.S. President Donald Trump is awarded the Order of Muhammad. Trump awards King Mohammed VI the Legion of Merit, degree of Chief Commander.

8 February
A social media campaign begins to reverse two articles of the penal code that outlaw sex outside of marriage after a victim of revenge porn is fined.
At least twenty-four people are killed when rain floods an illegal underground factory in Tangier.
25 February – Morocco is one of four countries added to the Financial Action Task Force (FATF) list of places that are only partially in compliance with international efforts against financing terrorism and money laundering.

March and April
2 March – Morocco cuts off communication with the ambassador of Germany to Morocco following German criticism of the government's stance on Western Sahara.
11 March – The government approves a bill that would legalize nonrecreational uses of marijuana.

July and August 
26 August – Start of the 2021 Moroccan general election campaigns.

September and October 
8 September
In the general election, the National Rally of Independents (RNI), led by businessman Aziz Akhannouch, wins a plurality of 97 seats in the House of Representatives, followed by the Authenticity and Modernity Party (PAM) with 82 seats and the Istiqlal Party with 78 seats.
The ruling Justice and Development Party (PJD) is projected to win only 12 seats.
Voter turnout is estimated at 50.3%, up from 43% in 2016.
22 September – Aziz Akhannouch announces that the RNI will form a coalition with the PAM and the Istiqlal Party.
7 October – Members of Aziz Akhannouch's cabinet are sworn in at the Royal Palace in Fez, in the presence of King Mohammed VI.

Scheduled events

Sports
26 March–4 April — Tour du Maroc
July – Morocco is scheduled to host the 2021 Africa U-17 Cup of Nations.

Deaths

January to June
1 January – Abderrahim Lahjouji, 79, construction executive and politician, founder of the Citizens' Forces.
6 February – Abdelkhalek Louzani, 75, footballer (Anderlecht, K.V.V. Crossing Elewijt, Olympic Charleroi); COVID-19.
20 March – Mohamed Ismaïl, 69, film director (Goodbye Mothers).
5 April – Haja El Hamdaouia, 91, singer-songwriter.

July to December

See also

 Western Sahara
 Sahrawi Arab Democratic Republic
COVID-19 pandemic in Africa
2020s
African Union
Berber languages
Arab League
Morocco–United States relations

References

 
2020s in Morocco
Years of the 21st century in Morocco
Morocco
Morocco